Vu Par, an album of remixed Autour de Lucie tracks, was released in 2001 on the Le Village Vert label and in 2002 on the Sony International label.

Track listing
 "Chanson de l'Arbre" – 5:13
 "Chanson de l'Arbre" – 5:06
 "Je Reviens" – 5:49
 "Mercenaires" – 2:54
 "Je Reviens" – 4:40
 "La Contradiction" – 4:22
 "Je Suis un Balancier" – 4:56
 "La Condition Pour Aimer" – 5:11
 "La Contradiction" – 3:46
 "Lent" – 9:23

Sources and links
 

Autour de Lucie albums
2001 albums
2002 albums